Perl Island, also known as Pearl Island, is a mountainous island off the Kenai Peninsula coast of Alaska. It is named for Perl D. Blodgett, a 19th-century settler in Kodiak.

On May 3, 2010, the United States Coast Guard Cutter Roanoke Island rescued the fishing boat Wahoo south of Perl Island.

References

Islands of Alaska
Islands of Anchorage, Alaska